Lebertiidae is a family of prostigs in the order Trombidiformes. There are at least 2 genera and about 14 described species in Lebertiidae.

Genera
 Estelloxus Habeeb, 1963
 Lebertia Neuman, 1880

References

Further reading

 
 
 
 

Trombidiformes
Acari families